Mvula is a surname of Zambian origin that may refer to:
Joyce Mvula (born 1994), Malawian netball player
Laura Mvula (born 1986), British singer
Wezzie Mvula, Malawian footballer

Ngoni-language surnames
Malawian surnames
Zambian surnames